The Outrage is a 1964 American Western film directed by Martin Ritt and starring Paul Newman, Laurence Harvey, Claire Bloom, Edward G. Robinson and William Shatner. It is a remake of  Akira Kurosawa's 1950 Japanese film Rashomon, based on stories by Ryūnosuke Akutagawa. Like Kurosawa's film, four people give contradictory accounts of a rape and murder. Ritt utilizes flashbacks to provide these contradictory accounts.

Plot
Three disparate travelers — a disillusioned preacher, an unsuccessful prospector, and a larcenous, cynical con man — meet at a decrepit railroad station in the 1870s Southwest United States. The prospector and the preacher were witnesses at the rape and murder trial of the notorious bandit Juan Carrasco. The bandit duped an aristocratic Southerner, Colonel Wakefield, into believing he knew the location of a lost Aztec treasure. While the greedy "gentleman" was bound to a tree and gagged, Carrasco assaulted his wife Nina. These events lead to the stabbing of the husband. Carrasco was tried, convicted, and condemned for the crimes.

Everyone's account on the witness stand differed dramatically. Carrasco claimed that Wakefield was tied up with ropes while Nina was assaulted, after which he killed the colonel in a duel. The newlywed wife contends that she was the one who killed her husband because he accused her of leading on Carrasco and causing the rape. The dead man "testifies" through a third witness, an old Indian shaman, who said that neither of those accounts was true. The shaman insists that the colonel used a jeweled dagger to commit suicide after the incident.

There was a fourth witness, the prospector, one with a completely new view of what actually took place. But can his version be trusted?

Cast
 Paul Newman as Juan Carrasco
 Laurence Harvey as Colonel Wakefield
 Claire Bloom as Nina Wakefield
 Edward G. Robinson as Con Man
 William Shatner as Preacher
 Howard Da Silva as Prospector
 Albert Salmi as Sheriff
 Thomas Chalmers as Judge
 Paul Fix as Indian

Home media
The Outrage was released to DVD by Warner Home Video on February 17, 2009 in a Region 1 widescreen DVD.

See also
 List of American films of 1964
 The Outrage (2011 film)

References

External links 
 
 
 
 
 

1964 films
1964 Western (genre) films
Adaptations of works by Akira Kurosawa
American Western (genre) films
1960s English-language films
Films scored by Alex North
Films about rape in the United States
Films directed by Martin Ritt
Metro-Goldwyn-Mayer films
American remakes of Japanese films
Films based on adaptations
Films based on short fiction
Films based on works by Ryūnosuke Akutagawa
1960s American films